Henry Patrick Clarke RHA (17 March 1889 – 6 January 1931) was an Irish stained-glass artist and book illustrator. Born in Dublin, he was a leading figure in the Irish Arts and Crafts Movement.

His work was influenced by both the Art Nouveau and Art Deco movements. His stained glass was particularly informed by the French Symbolist movement.

Early life
Henry Patrick Clarke was born 17 March 1889, younger son and third child of Joshua Clarke and Brigid (née MacGonigal) Clarke. Joshua Clarke was a church decorator who moved to Dublin from Leeds in 1877 and started a decorating business, Joshua Clarke & Sons, which later incorporated a stained glass division. Through his work with his father, Clarke was exposed to many schools of art but Art Nouveau in particular.

Clarke was educated at the Model School in Marlborough Street, Dublin and Belvedere College, which he left in 1905. He was devastated by the death of his mother in 1903, when he was only 14 years old. Clarke was then apprenticed into his father's studio, and attended evening classes in the Metropolitan College of Art and Design. His The Consecration of St Mel, Bishop of Longford, by St Patrick won the gold medal for stained glass work in the 1910 Board of Education National Competition.

At the art school in Dublin, Clarke met fellow artist and teacher, Margaret Crilley. They married on 31 October 1914 and moved into a flat at 33 North Frederick Street. In subsequent years the Clarkes lived in various locations in Dublin, including a semi-detached house in Cabra in which Margaret Clarke painted her husband at work. The Clarkes had three children, Michael, David, and Ann.

Career

Book illustration
Clarke briefly moved to London to seek work as a book illustrator. Picked up by London publisher Harrap, he started with two commissions which were never completed: Samuel Taylor Coleridge's The Rime of the Ancient Mariner (much of his work on which was destroyed during the 1916 Easter Rising) and an illustrated edition of Alexander Pope's The Rape of the Lock.

Clarke was commissioned by Committee of the Irish National War Memorial in 1919 to illustrate the Ireland's Memorial Records 1914-1918, a roll of honour for the 49,435 Irish who died during World War I. Illustrations for the 8 volumes were completed in 1922 and published in 1923, and a set is on display in the Irish National War Memorial Gardens. 100 copies of the book were distributed to cathedrals and libraries across Ireland and to other Allied countries. Each page features a large four-sided border of black and white illustrations by Clarke.

Difficulties with these projects made Fairy Tales by Hans Christian Andersen his first printed work, in 1916. It included 16 colour plates and more than 24 halftone illustrations. This was followed by an illustrations for an edition of Edgar Allan Poe's Tales of Mystery and Imagination: the first version of that title was restricted to halftone illustrations, while a second with eight colour plates and more than 24 halftone images was published in 1923.

This 1923 edition made his reputation as a book illustrator, during the golden age of gift-book illustration in the first quarter of the twentieth century. It was followed by editions of The Years at the Spring, with 12 colour plates and more than 14 monotone images; (Lettice D'Oyly Walters, ed., 1920), Charles Perrault's Fairy Tales of Perrault, and Goethe's Faust, with eight colour plates and more than 70 halftone and duotone images (New York: Hartsdale House, 1925). The last of these is his most famous work, prefiguring the imagery of 1960s psychedelia. Two of his most sought-after titles are promotional booklets for Jameson Irish Whiskey: A History of a Great House (1924, and subsequent reprints) and Elixir of Life (1925), which was written by Geofrey Warren. His final book, Selected Poems of Algernon Charles Swinburne, was published in 1928.

Stained glass

Clarke produced more than 130 windows, he and his brother Walter having taken over his father's studio after his death in 1921. His glass is distinguished by the finesse of its drawing and his use of rich colours, and an innovative integration of the window leading as part of the overall design, originally inspired by an early visit to see the stained glass of the Cathedral of Chartres. He was especially fond of deep blues. Clarke's use of heavy lines in his black-and-white book illustrations echoes his glass techniques.

Clarke's stained glass work includes many religious windows, but also much secular stained glass. Highlights of the former include the windows of the Honan Chapel in University College Cork; of the latter, a window illustrating John Keats' The Eve of St. Agnes (now in the Hugh Lane Municipal Gallery in Dublin) and the Geneva Window, created for the Centre William Rappard in Geneva, Switzerland (now in the Wolfsonian Museum, Miami, Florida, USA). Perhaps his most seen works were the windows he made for Bewley's Café on Dublin's Grafton Street, which was subject to court proceedings in 2022 in a dispute between landlord and tenant over ownership, as RGRE v Bewley's.

Later years and death
Both Harry and his brother Walter were plagued with ill health, in particular problems with their lungs. Clarke was diagnosed with tuberculosis in 1929, and went to a sanatorium in Davos, Switzerland. Fearing that he would die abroad, he began his journey back to Dublin in 1931, but died on 6 January 1931 in Chur where he was buried. A headstone was erected; but local law required that the family pledge to maintain the grave 15 years after the death. This was not explained to the Clarke family and Harry Clarke's remains were disinterred in 1946 and reburied in a communal grave.

Legacy
In 2019 a bridge in Cabra, Dublin, was renamed "Harry Clarke Bridge" in his honour.

Gallery

Stained glass windows

Illustrations

Works

As illustrator 

 Poe, E. A. - Tales of Mystery and Imagination, George Harrap, London, 1919
 Walters, L. - The Year's at the Spring, George Harrap, London, 1920 The Year's at the Spring via HathiTrust
 Perrault, C. - The Fairy Tales of Charles Perrault, George Harrap, London, 1922
 _ Ireland's Memorial Records 1914-1918, Maunsel and Roberts, Dublin, 1923
 _ Jameson The Origin of John Jameson Whiskey, Jameson 1924
  The Elixir of Life Jameson 1925
 Goethe, J. W. von - Faust, George Harrap, London, 1925
 Swinburne, A. C. - Selected Poems of Charles Swinburne, John Lane, London, 1928

See also

An Túr Gloine, stained glass firm with which Clarke was associated
Harry Clarke - Darkness In Light

References

Further reading
 Nicola Gordon Bowe. 1994. The Life and Work of Harry Clarke (Irish Academic Press)
 Martin Moore Steenson. 2003. A Bibliographical Checklist of the Work of Harry Clarke (Books & Things)
 John J Doherty. 2003. Harry Clarke - Darkness In Light A film on the life and work of Harry Clarke (Camel Productions)
 Lucy Costigan and Michael Cullen. 2010. Strangest Genius: The Stained Glass of Harry Clarke (The History Press Ireland)
 Teehan, Virginia; Heckett, Elizabeth. The Honan Chapel: A Golden Vision. Cork: Cork University Press, 2005. 
 Marguerite Helmers, Harry Clarke’s War: Illustrations for Ireland’s Memorial Records, 1914-1918 (Irish Academic Press, 2015). 
 Angela Griffith, Marguerite Helmers & Róisín Kennedy (Eds), Harry Clarke and Artistic Visions of the New Irish State (Irish Academic Press, 2018). 
 Lucy Costigan and Michael Cullen, Dark Beauty: Hidden Detail in Harry Clarke’s Stained Glass (Merrion Press 2019).

External links 

 Harry Clarke Stained Glass Site
 Harry Clarke's family tree
 
 
 Harry Clarke's Looking Glass at The Public Domain Review

 
Irish illustrators
Irish stained glass artists and manufacturers
1889 births
1931 deaths
Arts and Crafts movement artists
Fantasy artists
Irish speculative fiction artists
Swiss speculative fiction artists
Alumni of the National College of Art and Design
People associated with University College Cork
People educated at Belvedere College
Tuberculosis deaths in Switzerland
20th-century deaths from tuberculosis
20th-century illustrators of fairy tales
Mac Conghail family